Parliamentary elections were held in Latvia on 4 October 2014. The previous elections were held in 2011, but according to the country's constitution, the parliamentary term was reduced to only three years following early elections (the 2011 elections took place a year after the 2010 elections).

Campaign
On 27 December 2013, the Reform Party announced an electoral pact with its government coalition partner Unity, with most prominent Reform Party candidates running under the Unity campaign. On 16 July 2014 the Latvian Social Democratic Workers' Party signed a cooperation pact with the Latvian Association of Regions to run under the LAR campaign.

The main party of the Harmony Centre alliance, the Social Democratic Party "Harmony" contested the elections with a separate list, whilst fellow alliance members the Latvian Socialist Party announced on 20 July 2014 that they would not contest the election.

Results

Aftermath
Following the elections, a centre-right coalition government was formed by Unity, the Union of Greens and Farmers and the National Alliance. However, the government resigned on 7 December 2015.

References

Latvia
Parliamentary
Parliamentary elections in Latvia